Cornelius Haley (December 20, 1860 – September 28, 1936) was an American politician and molder from New York.

Life 
Haley was born on December 20, 1860 in Little Falls, New York, the son of Irish immigrants John and Mary Haley. He started working in woolen mills in Little Falls when he was 11. When he was about 16 he moved with his family to Schuyler Lake, where he lived for about 2 years before returning to Little Falls and the woolen mills. He later moved to New Jersey and learned to be a molder, a profession he'd follow for several years. He moved to Utica in 1883.

In 1890, Haley was elected to the New York State Assembly as a Democrat, representing the Oneida County 1st District. He served in the Assembly in 1891, 1892, and 1893. In 1893, he was appointed chief clerk of the Bureau of Statistics and Labor in Albany. He resigned from the position in 1896. In the 1896 United States House of Representatives election, he was an unsuccessful candidate in New York's 25th congressional district. He served as mayor of Little Falls from 1922 to 1923.

In 1886, Haley married Elizabeth Hannon of Sharon, Pennsylvania. Their children were Mamie Perpetua and James Bernard. Elizabeth died in 1892.

Haley died at home on September 28, 1936.

References

External links 

 The Political Graveyard

1860 births
1936 deaths
American people of Irish descent
People from Little Falls, New York
Politicians from Utica, New York
Mayors of places in New York (state)
19th-century American politicians
20th-century American politicians
Democratic Party members of the New York State Assembly
Moldmakers